The bilateral relations between the Kingdom of Cambodia and the People's Republic of China have strengthened considerably after the end of the Cambodian–Vietnamese War, during which China had supported the Khmer Rouge against Vietnam.

History 
 
 
Although the countries share no common border, China has had a historic cultural and commercial relationship with Cambodia. The 950,000 Chinese in Cambodia constitute 3-5% of Cambodia's population, and although they were discriminated against by the Khmer Rouge and the Vietnamese, they have re-emerged as a prominent business community.

The first contacts between China and the Khmer Empire of Cambodia occurred in the Tang period, and for centuries onward the two countries shared a strong trading relationship. A Chola-Song-Khmer trade axis dominated trade in the east for much of the 11th and 12th centuries. Yuan Chinese accounts of the Cambodian kingdom proved to be crucial to uncovering the history of the region. Cambodia maintained relations with Ming China as early as 1421 AD during the final years of the Khmer Empire when Ponhea Yat dispatched a minister to establish formal diplomatic ties. China has used Cambodia as a counterweight to the dominating influence of Vietnam. In the mid-20th century, Communist China supported the Maoist Khmer Rouge against Lon Nol's regime, who Nationalist China had ties with, during the Cambodian Civil War and then its takeover of Cambodia in 1975. Also, Mao Zedong had fostered good relations with Prince Norodom Sihanouk, who also fought against Lon Nol and backed the Khmer Rouge. When Vietnamese military invaded Cambodia in 1978, China provided extensive political and military support for the Khmer Rouge. In 1979, the Chinese People's Liberation Army waged a brief border war against Vietnam, partly to threaten it into pulling out of Cambodia. The Paris Peace Conference on Cambodia, from July 1989 to October 1991, resolved Cambodia–China relations and contributed to reintegrating China into major power multilateral negotiations. After Vietnam's withdrawal from Cambodia and then the 1993 UN-sponsored elections recognized and supported the new democratic government.

 
Since 1997, China began developing closer relations with the regime of Cambodian Prime Minister Hun Sen, once a pro-Vietnamese leader and a defector from the Khmer Rouge during Vietnam's occupation of Cambodia. Although initially backing Hun Sen's political opponent Prince Norodom Ranariddh and his FUNCINPEC, China was disenchanted with Ranariddh's efforts to build a closer relationship with Taiwan, which is claimed by China. Facing international isolation after the 1997 coup that brought him to power, Hun Sen cultivated close ties with China, which opposed efforts by Western countries to impose economic sanctions on Cambodia. China's close ties with Cambodia have also served to gain leverage against Vietnamese influence in the region.

In June 2020, Cambodia was one of 53 countries that backed the Hong Kong national security law at the United Nations.

Chinese assistance
During the visit of Chinese Premier Wen Jiabao between April 7-April 8, 2006 both nations signed several bilateral agreements and a treaty of "Comprehensive Partnership of Cooperation." China diversified its aid and investments in Cambodia and promised to provide US$600 million in loans and grants. China has canceled much of Cambodia's debt and granted a fresh loan of US$12.4 million for the construction of the building housing the Cambodian government's council of ministers and the restoration of the Angkor Wat temple and heritage site. About $200 million has been earmarked as a low-interest loan for the construction of bridges spanning the Mekong and Tonle Sap rivers. China has cultivated strong ties with Cambodia, gaining access to its sea ports that can allow China to exploit oil reserves in the Gulf of Tonkin. During the visit, Cambodian Prime Minister Hun Sen described China as Cambodia's "most trustworthy friend."

China has also cultivated military ties. In the aftermath of the 1997 coup, China provided US$2.8 million in military aid and has since supplied wide range of military equipment, training of military and police cadre and naval vessels to combat drug trafficking and piracy. China has also funded Chinese language schools in Cambodia. Immigration of Chinese workers to Cambodia has also stepped up in recent years and is estimated between 50,000 and 300,000.

Commerce 

Trade between Cambodia and China totaled US$4.8 billion in 2016, compared to $732 million in 2006 and has increased by an average of 26% for the last 10 years. However, Cambodia has a significant trade deficit with China, importing over $3.9 billion (raw fabrics being the largest constituent) compared to its exports of $830 million. It was estimated that 60% of products in Cambodian markets are Chinese-made on 2006, and 24% of Cambodian imports were from China in 2015. There are multiple large-scale Chinese investment projects in Cambodia such as the 400 MW Lower Se San 2 Dam worth $781 million and a US$3.8 billion deepwater port project on a 90-km stretch of Cambodian coastline. According to the Cambodian Center for Human Rights, the Cambodian government gave over 4.6 million hectares in concessions to 107 Chinese-owned firms between 1994 and 2012.

Concerns

 
China's dominant participation in Cambodia's economy, its close cultivation of ties with the Cambodian government and the influx of Chinese immigrants has raised concerns about an anti-Chinese backlash from Cambodians, many of whom resent China for its support of the Khmer Rouge, which conducted a genocide that claimed the lives of more than 1.7 million Cambodians. The Cambodian government's suppression of the Falun gong, a cult group banned by China, and extradition of 2 Falungong activists to China was criticized by human rights activities and the U.N. commission for refugees. China's influence is suspected to be shielding the pro-China Khmer Rouge leaders from standing trial for crimes against humanity. Suspected preferential treatment for Cambodia-based Chinese firms and the National Assembly of Cambodia's guarantee of profits for the Chinese investors in the Kamchay power plant has also provoked widespread criticism of China's growing political clout in Cambodia.

There has been a massive influx of Chinese investment in Cambodia, as the country begins to heal and stabilize from the decades of civil war and unrest during the Cold War. Cambodia also receives a formidable amount of aid from China; hence, Chinese influence over Cambodia should not be underestimated, despite Prime Minister Hun Sen’s insistence that “China does not control his country of 15 million”. The Cambodian government still heavily rely on foreign aid. Strong Chinese influence in the country does, without a doubt, have its benefits along with its problems. It could be argued that the benefits and the problems are a matter of perspective, but this is not entirely the case.

Cambodia's choice of alignment, is not strange if looked at from a practical standpoint. Not only does the country have cultural ties with China; it is also in closer proximity compared to the United States. With Chinese aid, roads, bridges, and dams among other things are being built in Cambodia; this is undeniably positive for the country. From 1994 to 2012 “China invested a total of US$9.17 billion” in Cambodia. However, Chinese firms that are developing and investing in Cambodia, also tend to have extractive tendencies which exploits the country's natural resources. Illegal logging and shady deals involving members of Cambodia's government and Chinese firms are on a steady rise. Mining projects and government land concessions to foreign and local firms, are increasing the number of people being displaced from their land. Strangio describes China's aid to Cambodia as “hefty amounts of loans and investment dollars unconstrained by human rights or good governance concerns”. This means that firms and corrupt government officials that benefit from the investments, will act to maximize their profits with little concern for human rights or the rule of law.

The international community maintains its leverage over the policy of Cambodia, concerning human rights, corruption, and good governance, through controlling the amount of aid given. The increase in Chinese aid with no strings attached; however, threatens to alleviate Cambodia of western pressures, and may lead to an increase in human rights violations by the government. Land evictions is becoming more and more common in Cambodia; in 2006 in Mondulkiri province, the Phong hill tribes “claim that the Chinese company has colluded with the Cambodian government to illegally force them from their ancestral homeland”. The very recent Boeung Kak and Borei Keila evictions in Phnom Penh were seen by many observers as the Cambodian Government's increasing drift away from the adherence to human rights.
The Chinese funded Sesan Dam project in the northeastern part of Cambodia, threaten to lower the fish stocks, and affect the livelihood of many Khmer. “By one estimate, the project will result in a 9 percent drop in fish stocks in the entire Mekong Basin”.

In July 2019, UN ambassadors of 37 countries, including Cambodia, have signed a joint letter to the UNHRC defending China's treatment of Uyghurs and other Muslim minority groups in the Xinjiang region.

See also 

 String of Pearls

References 

 
Cambodia 
China